Otakar Krámský (1 July 1959 Jilemnice, – 25 April 2015) was a Czech hillclimbing racecar driver. He began his career during the early 1970s. He won three European Hill Climb Championship.

Krámský died after his racecar crashed during a race in Styria, Austria, aged 55.

References

External links

 Official website

1959 births
2015 deaths
Czech racing drivers